The Hawaii Solicitor General or Solicitor General of Hawaii is the top appellate lawyer for the State of Hawaii. It is an appointed position within the Hawaii Department of the Attorney General, with supervision over all of the office's major appellate cases and amicus briefs. The majority of the matters that the Solicitor General handles are argued in the United States Supreme Court, the Hawaii Supreme Court, the United States Court of Appeals for the Ninth Circuit, and the Hawaii Intermediate Court of Appeals.

Creation 
The office of Hawaii Solicitor General was created in 2007 by then Attorney General Mark J. Bennett, who selected then Supervisor of the Appellate Division Dorothy Sellers to become Hawaii’s first Solicitor General.

List of Solicitors General 
The current Hawaii Solicitor General is Kimberly Tsumoto Guidry.

References 

Government of Hawaii
Hawaii law